Lindsay Myers (born November 2, 1989) is an American professional racing cyclist who rides for Tibco–Silicon Valley Bank.

See also
 List of 2016 UCI Women's Teams and riders

References

External links
 

1989 births
Living people
American female cyclists
Place of birth missing (living people)
21st-century American women